Marcus Vinicius Vieira de Souza (born May 31, 1984), commonly known as Marquinhos Vieira, or simply Marquinhos, is a Brazilian professional basketball player. He currently plays with São Paulo FC in the Novo Basquete Brasil (NBB). He also represents the senior Brazilian national team. 

At a height of 2.07 m (6'9") tall, and a weight of 102 kg (225 lbs.), he can play at both the small forward and power forward positions.

Professional career

Early career
In the 2004–05 season, Vieira played professionally in the Italian 2nd Division, with Premiata Montegranaro. He played professionally with São Carlos Clube Basquete in Brazil, in the 2005–06 season. Vieira was a second round NBA draft choice of the New Orleans/Oklahoma City Hornets, in the 2006 NBA draft, chosen 43rd overall.

NBA
Vieira played in a total of 26 NBA games with the New Orleans/Oklahoma City Hornets, scoring 50 points. He spent part of the 2006–07 NBA season with the NBA Development League's Tulsa 66ers, for whom he played 13 games. In 2008, he was traded to the Memphis Grizzlies, only to be waived 2 days later.

National team career
Vieira has also been a member of the senior men's Brazilian national basketball team. With Brazil, he has played at the following major tournaments: the 2007 Pan American Games, the 2007 FIBA AmeriCup, the 2010 FIBA World Cup, the 2011 FIBA AmeriCup, the 2012 Summer Olympics, the 2014 FIBA World Cup, the 2015 FIBA AmeriCup, and the 2016 Summer Olympics.

Career statistics

NBA

Regular season

|-
| style="text-align:left;"| 
| style="text-align:left;"| New Orleans/Oklahoma City
| 13 || 0 || 7.9 || .467 || .429 || .714 || .8 || .4 || .2 || .1 || 1.7
|-
| style="text-align:left;"| 
| style="text-align:left;"| New Orleans
| 13 || 0 || 5.3 || .450 || .417 || .455 || .6 || .2 || .1 || .1 || 2.2
|- class="sortbottom"
| style="text-align:center;" colspan="2" | Career
| 26 || 0 || 6.6 || .457 || .421 || .571 || .7 || .3 || .1 || .1 || 1.9

NBB

Regular season

Playoffs

Notes

References

External links

Marquinhos Vieira at LatinBasket.com
Marquinhos Vieira at ESPN.com
Marquinhos Vieira at Italian League 
Marquinhos Vieira at NBB 

1984 births
Living people
2010 FIBA World Championship players
2014 FIBA Basketball World Cup players
Associação Bauru Basketball players
Basketball players at the 2007 Pan American Games
Basketball players at the 2012 Summer Olympics
Basketball players at the 2016 Summer Olympics
Brazilian expatriate basketball people in the United States
Brazilian expatriate sportspeople in Italy
Brazilian men's basketball players
CR Vasco da Gama basketball players
Esporte Clube Pinheiros basketball players
Expatriate basketball people in Italy
Flamengo basketball players
Lega Basket Serie A players
Mogi das Cruzes Basquete players
Novo Basquete Brasil players
National Basketball Association players from Brazil
New Orleans Hornets draft picks
New Orleans Hornets players
Olympic basketball players of Brazil
Pan American Games gold medalists for Brazil
Pan American Games medalists in basketball
Power forwards (basketball)
Small forwards
Sport Club Corinthians Paulista basketball players
Basketball players from Rio de Janeiro (city)
Sutor Basket Montegranaro players
Tulsa 66ers players
2019 FIBA Basketball World Cup players
Medalists at the 2007 Pan American Games
São Paulo FC basketball players